Ellen Creathorne Clayton, Mrs Needham; 15 February 1834 – 19 July 1900), born Eleanor Creathorne Clayton, was an author and artist.

Biography
Eleanor Creathorne Clayton was born in Dublin on 15 February 1834 but moved to London with her father in 1841. Her father, Benjamin Clayton III, was a wood engraver. Her grandfather, Benjamin Clayton II, and her great-grandfather Benjamin Clayton I, were also wood engravers. Her aunt, Caroline Millard, was wood engraver based in Dublin.

Clayton was contributing articles and illustrations from the age of fourteen to a number of papers including Sala's paper as well as two of her father's publications, Chat and Punchinello. Though she is best known for her dictionary of English women painters, Clayton also wrote a number of novels and histories. Clayton created cards and calendars as well.

In February 1879, Clayton married solicitor James Henry Needham but continued to publish under her maiden name. She died in a nursing home in London in 1900.

Bibliography
 The world's Fair (1851)
 Notable women (1859, reprinted 1875)
 Women of the Reformation (1861)
Queens of song: being memoirs of some of the most celebrated female vocalists who have appeared on the lyric state, from the earliest days of opera to the present time: To which is added a chronological list of all the operas that have been performed in Europe (1865)
 Female warriors (1879)
 A girl's destiny (1882)
English Female Artists, 2 volumes, 1876

References

External links
 

1834 births
1900 deaths
19th-century British women writers
19th-century British writers
19th-century British artists